Pradip Kumar Chakraborti (born November 7, 1956) is an Indian molecular biologist, biochemist was the Chief scientist at Institute of Microbial Technology (IMTECH),  a constituent institution of the Council of Scientific and Industrial Research and presently a Professor in the Department of Biotechnology at School of Chemical and Life Sciences in Jamia Hamdard, New Delhi. Known for his studies on Prokaryotic signal transduction, Chakraborti is an elected fellow of all three Science Academies in India the National Academy of Sciences, India, Indian Academy of Sciences and the Indian National Science Academy. His studies have been documented by way of a number of articles and ResearchGate, an online repository of scientific articles, has listed 98 of them. Besides, he has also contributed chapters to books edited by others. The Department of Biotechnology of the Government of India awarded him the National Bioscience Award for Career Development, one of the highest Indian science awards, for his contributions to biosciences in 2001.

Selected bibliography

Chapters

Articles

See also 

 Polyphosphate Synthesis
 Phosphorylation

Notes

References

External links 
 

N-BIOS Prize recipients
20th-century Indian biologists
Indian scientific authors
Living people
Fellows of the Indian Academy of Sciences
1956 births
Scientists from West Bengal
Fellows of the Indian National Science Academy
Indian molecular biologists
Indian biochemists